The Last Thing You Forget is a compilation album by American rock band Title Fight. Originally released as a three-song EP on 7-inch vinyl in July 2009, the September CD reissue also includes two of Title Fight's prior EPs (their 2007 split with The Erection Kids and 2008's Kingston) and a previously unreleased track.

Track listing

Notes
On streaming services, the titles of "Evander" and "Anaconda Sniper" are accidentally switched.

On the original 7-inch release, there is a hidden, untitled instrumental track on the B-side.

Personnel
Jamie Rhoden – vocals, guitar
Shane Moran – guitar
Ben Russin – drums
Ned Russin – bass, vocals

Technical personnel
Joe Loftus – engineer
Jay Maas – engineer
Mastering by Bill Wickham and Jay Maas

References

2009 compilation albums
Title Fight albums
Run for Cover Records albums